EXT2 can refer to:

EXT2 (gene), a human gene
ext2, a file system for the Linux kernel